The Minnesota Senate, District 11, includes portions of Carlton, Kanabec, Pine and St. Louis counties in the northeastern part of the state. It is currently held by Republican Jason Rarick who was elected in a special election in 2019.

List of senators 

Minnesota Senate districts
Carlton County, Minnesota
St. Louis County, Minnesota
Kanabec County, Minnesota
Pine County, Minnesota